Henriette Dibon, also known as Farfantello, (1902-1989) was a French poet and short story writer. A member of the Félibrige, she wrote both in Provençal and French. She won three literary prizes from the Académie française.

Early life
Henriette Dibon was born on 9 August 1902 in Avignon, France.

Career
Dibon was a teacher. She also served as the curator of the Musée Roure in Avignon.

Dibon was the author of many poetry and short story collections in Provençal and French. She was a member of the Félibrige, and Joseph d'Arbaud prefaced her 1934 poetry collection entitled Li lambrusco. Meanwhile, her poetry was praised by Charles Rostaing and René Jouveau.

Dibon won three literary prizes from the Académie française: the Prix Valentine de Wolmar for Ratis in 1967; the Prix Amic for Le Radeau in 1974; and the Prix Broquette-Gonin for Le marquis de Baroncelli in 1982.

Death and legacy
Dibon died on 9 September 1989 in Avignon. She bequeathed a notebook of memories about the Félibrige to the Bibliothèque Méjanes in Aix-en-Provence.

Works

References

1902 births
1989 deaths
Writers from Avignon
20th-century French poets
French women short story writers
French short story writers
French women poets
20th-century French women writers
People of Camargue